Val de Briey is a commune in the department of Meurthe-et-Moselle, northeastern France. The municipality was established on 1 January 2017 by merger of the former communes of Briey (the seat), Mancieulles and Mance.

Population
The population data given in the table below refer to the commune in its geography as of January 2020.

See also 
Communes of the Meurthe-et-Moselle department

References 

Communes of Meurthe-et-Moselle
Subprefectures in France